Basantapur is a village development committee in the Kapilvastu District in the Lumbini Zone of southern Nepal. At the time of the 1991 Nepal census it had a population of 2352.

References

Populated places in Kapilvastu District